Nameless Island (Spanish: Isla Sin Nombre) is an islet of the Galápagos Islands group, in Ecuador, between Pinzón Island and Santa Cruz Island (Galápagos). The island is most commonly used for scuba diving.

References

Islands of the Galápagos Islands